Scopa may refer to:

 Scopa, a card game
 Scopa (biology), an anatomical feature of insects
 Scopa, Piedmont, a municipality in Italy
 An acronym for the Supreme Court of Pennsylvania
 SCOPA FC,

See also
 SOCPA, the Serious Organized Crimes and Police Act, a UK anti-terrorism law